This is a list of foreign ministers in 1994.

Africa
 Algeria - Mohamed Salah Dembri (1993-1996)
 Angola - Venâncio da Silva Moura (1992-1999)
 Benin - Robert Dossou (1993-1995)
 Botswana -
Gaositwe K.T. Chiepe (1985-1994)
Mompati Merafhe (1994-2008)
 Burkina Faso -
Thomas Sanou (1992-1994)
Ablassé Ouedraogo (1994-1999)
 Burundi - Jean-Marie Ngendahayo (1993-1995)
 Cameroon - Ferdinand Oyono (1992-1997)
 Cape Verde - Manuel Casimiro de Jesus Chantre (1993-1995)
 Central African Republic - Simon Bedaya-Ngaro (1993-1996)
 Chad -
Korom Ahmad (1993-1994)
Ahmat Abderahmane Haggar (1994-1996)
 Comoros -
Mouslim Ben Moussa (1993-1994)
Said Mohamed Sagaf (1994-1995)
 Congo - Benjamin Bounkoulou (1992-1995)
 Côte d'Ivoire - Amara Essy (1990-2000)
 Djibouti - Mohamed Bolock Abdou (1993-1995)
 Egypt - Amr Moussa (1991-2001)
 Equatorial Guinea - Miguel Oyono Ndong Mifumu (1993-1999)
 Eritrea -
Mahmoud Ahmed Sherifo (1993-1994)
Petros Solomon (1994-1997)
 Ethiopia - Seyoum Mesfin (1991-2010)
 Gabon -
Pascaline Mferri Bongo (1991-1994)
Jean Ping (1994)
Casimir Oyé-Mba (1994-1999)
 The Gambia -
Omar Sey (1987-1994)
Bolong Sonko (1994-1995)
 Ghana - Obed Asamoah (1981-1997)
 Guinea -
Ibrahima Sylla (1993-1994)
Kozo Zoumanigui (1994-1996)
 Guinea-Bissau - Bernardino Cardoso (1992-1995)
 Kenya - Kalonzo Musyoka (1993-1998)
 Lesotho -
Molapo Qhobela (1993-1994)
Evaristus Sekhonyana (1994)
Molapo Qhobela (1994-1995)
 Liberia -
Momolu Sirleaf (1993-1994)
Dorothy Musuleng-Cooper (1994-1995)
 Libya - Umar Mustafa al-Muntasir (1992-2000)
 Madagascar - Jacques Sylla (1993-1996)
 Malawi -
Hetherwick Ntaba (1993-1994)
Edward Bwanali (1994-1996)
 Mali -
Ibrahim Boubacar Keïta (1993-1994)
Sy Kadiatou Sow (1994)
Dioncounda Traoré (1994-1997)
 Mauritania -
Mohamed Abderahmane Ould Moine (1992-1994)
Mohamed Salem Ould Lekhal (1994-1996)
 Mauritius -
Swalay Kasenally (1993-1994)
Ramduthsing Jaddoo (1994-1995)
 Morocco - Abdellatif Filali (1985-1999)
 Western Sahara - Mohamed Salem Ould Salek (1988-1995)
 Mozambique -
Pascoal Mocumbi (1987-1994)
Leonardo Simão (1994-2005)
 Namibia - Theo-Ben Gurirab (1990-2002)
 Niger - Abdourahmane Hama (1993-1995)
 Nigeria - Baba Gana Kingibe (1993-1995)
 Rwanda -
Anastase Gasana (1993-1994)
Jérôme Bicamumpaka (1994)
Jean-Marie Ndagijimana (1994)
Anastase Gasana (1994-1999)
 São Tomé and Príncipe -
Albertino Bragança (1993-1994)
Guilherme Posser da Costa (1994-1996)
 Senegal - Moustapha Niasse (1993-1998)
 Seychelles - Danielle de St. Jorre (1989-1997)
 Sierra Leone -
Karefa Kargbo (1993-1994)
Abass Bundu (1994-1995)
 Somalia - no central government
 Somaliland - ?
 South Africa -
Pik Botha (1977-1994)
Alfred Baphethuxolo Nzo (1994-1999)
 Sudan - Hussein Suleiman Abu Saleh (1993-1995)
 Swaziland - Solomon Dlamini (1993-1995)
 Tanzania - Joseph Rwegasira (1993-1995)
 Togo -
Fambaré Ouattara Natchaba (1992-1994)
Boumbéra Alassounouma (1994-1995)
 Tunisia - Habib Ben Yahia (1991-1997)
 Uganda -
Paul Ssemogerere (1988-1994)
Ruhakana Rugunda (1994-1996)
 Zaire -
Mpinga Kasenda (1993-1994)
Lunda Bululu (1994-1995)
 Zambia -
Vernon Mwaanga (1991-1994)
Remmy Mushota (1994-1995)
 Zimbabwe - Nathan Shamuyarira (1987-1995)

Asia
 Afghanistan -
Hedayat Amin Arsala (1993-1994)
Najibullah Lafraie (1994-1996)
 Armenia - Vahan Papasyan (1993-1996)
 Azerbaijan - Hasan Hasanov (1993-1998)
 Nagorno-Karabakh - Arkadi Ghukasyan (1993-1997)
 Bahrain - Sheikh Muhammad ibn Mubarak ibn Hamad Al Khalifah (1971-2005)
 Bangladesh - A.S.M. Mostafizur Rahman (1991-1996)
 Bhutan - Dawa Tsering (1972-1998)
 Brunei - Pengiran Muda Mohamed Bolkiah (1984–2015)
 Cambodia -
Prince Norodom Sirivudh (1993-1994)
Ung Huot (1994-1998)
 China - Qian Qichen (1988-1998)
 Georgia - Aleksandre Chikvaidze (1992-1995)
 Abkhazia - Sokrat Jinjolia (1993-1994)
 India - Dinesh Singh (1993-1995)
 Indonesia - Ali Alatas (1988-1999)
 Iran - Ali Akbar Velayati (1981-1997)
 Iraq - Muhammad Saeed al-Sahhaf (1992-2001)
 Israel - Shimon Peres (1992-1995)
 Japan -
Tsutomu Hata (1993-1994)
Koji Kakizawa (1994)
Yōhei Kōno (1994-1996)
 Jordan -
Kamel Abu Jaber (1991-1994)
Abdelsalam al-Majali (1994-1995)
 Kazakhstan -
Tuleutai Suleimenov (1991-1994)
Kanat Saudabayev (1994)
Kassym-Jomart Tokayev (1994-1999)
 North Korea - Kim Yong-nam (1983-1998)
 South Korea -
Han Seung-ju (1993-1994)
Gong Ro-myeong (1994-1996)
 Kuwait - Sheikh Sabah Al-Ahmad Al-Jaber Al-Sabah (1978-2003)
 Kyrgyzstan -
Myrza Kaparov (1993-1994)
Roza Otunbayeva (1994-1997)
 Laos - Somsavat Lengsavad (1993-2006)
 Lebanon - Farès Boueiz (1992-1998)
 Malaysia - Abdullah Ahmad Badawi (1991-1999)
 Maldives - Fathulla Jameel (1978-2005)
 Mongolia - Tserenpiliyn Gombosüren (1988-1996)
 Myanmar - Ohn Gyaw (1991-1998)
 Nepal -
Girija Prasad Koirala (1991-1994)
Madhav Kumar Nepal (1994-1995)
 Oman - Yusuf bin Alawi bin Abdullah (1982–2020)
 Pakistan - Aseff Ahmad Ali (1993-1996)
 Philippines - Roberto Romulo (1992-1995)
 Qatar - Sheikh Hamad bin Jassim bin Jaber Al Thani (1992-2013)
 Saudi Arabia - Prince Saud bin Faisal bin Abdulaziz Al Saud (1975–2015)
 Singapore -
Wong Kan Seng (1988-1994)
S. Jayakumar (1994-2004)
 Sri Lanka -
Abdul Cader Shahul Hameed (1993-1994)
Lakshman Kadirgamar (1994-2001)
 Syria - Farouk al-Sharaa (1984-2006)
 Taiwan - Fredrick Chien (1990-1996)
 Tajikistan -
Rashid Alimov (1992-1994)
Talbak Nazarov (1994-2006)
 Thailand -
Prasong Soonsiri (1992-1994)
Thaksin Shinawatra (1994-1995)
 Turkey -
Hikmet Çetin (1991-1994)
Mümtaz Soysal (1994)
Murat Karayalçın (1994-1995)
 Turkmenistan - vacant
 United Arab Emirates - Rashid Abdullah Al Nuaimi (1980-2006)
 Uzbekistan -
Saidmukhtar Saidkasimov (1993-1994)
Abdulaziz Komilov (1994-2003)
 Vietnam - Nguyễn Mạnh Cầm (1991-2000)
 Yemen -
Mohammed Basindawa (1993-1994)
Abd al-Karim al-Iryani (1994-1998)

Australia and Oceania
 Australia - Gareth Evans (1988-1996)
 Fiji -
Filipe Bole (1992-1994)
Sitiveni Rabuka (1994)
Filipe Bole (1994-1997)
 Kiribati -
Teatao Teannaki (1991-1994)
Teburoro Tito (1994-2003)
 Marshall Islands -
Tom Kijiner (1988-1994)
Phillip H. Muller (1994-2000)
 Micronesia - Resio S. Moses (1991-1996)
 Nauru - Bernard Dowiyogo (1989-1995)
 New Zealand - Don McKinnon (1990-1999)
 Cook Islands - Inatio Akaruru (1989-1999)
 Palau - Andres Uherbelau (1994-1996)
 Papua New Guinea -
John Kaputin (1992-1994)
Sir Julius Chan (1994-1996)
 Solomon Islands -
Job Tausinga (1993-1994)
Francis Saemala (1994-1995)
 Tonga - Prince Tupouto'a Tungi (1979-1998)
 Tuvalu - Kamuta Latasi (1993-1996)
 Vanuatu - Maxime Carlot Korman (1993-1995)
 Western Samoa - Tofilau Eti Alesana (1988-1998)

Europe
 Albania - Alfred Serreqi (1992-1996)
 Andorra -
Antoni Armengol (1993-1994)
Marc Vila Amigo (1994)
Manuel Mas Ribó (1994-1997)
 Austria - Alois Mock (1987-1995)
 Belarus -
Petr Krauchenka (1990-1994)
Uladzimir Syanko (1994-1997)
 Belgium -
Willy Claes (1992-1994)
Frank Vandenbroucke (1994-1995)
 Brussels-Capital Region - Jos Chabert (1989-1999)
 Flanders - Luc Van den Brande (1992-1999)
 Wallonia -
 Guy Spitaels (1992-1994)
 Robert Collignon (1994-1995)
 Bosnia and Herzegovina - Irfan Ljubijankić (1993-1995)
Republika Srpska - Aleksa Buha (1992-1998)
 Bulgaria - Stanislav Daskalov (1993-1995)
 Croatia - Mate Granić (1993-2000)
 Cyprus - Alekos Michaelides (1993-1997)
 Northern Cyprus - Atay Ahmet Raşit (1994-1996)
 Czech Republic - Josef Zieleniec (1992-1997)
 Denmark - Niels Helveg Petersen (1993-2000)
 Estonia -
Trivimi Velliste (1992-1994)
Jüri Luik (1994-1995)
 Finland - Heikki Haavisto (1993-1995)
 France - Alain Juppé (1993-1995)
 Germany - Klaus Kinkel (1992-1998)
 Greece - Karolos Papoulias (1993-1996)
 Hungary -
Géza Jeszenszky (1990-1994)
László Kovács (1994-1998)
 Iceland - Jón Baldvin Hannibalsson (1988-1995)
 Ireland -
Dick Spring (1993-1994)
Albert Reynolds (acting) (1994)
Dick Spring (1994-1997)
 Italy -
Beniamino Andreatta (1993-1994)
Antonio Martino (1994-1995)
 Latvia -
Georgs Andrejevs (1992-1994)
Valdis Birkavs (1994-1999)
 Liechtenstein - Andrea Willi (1993-2001)
 Lithuania - Povilas Gylys (1992-1996)
 Luxembourg - Jacques Poos (1984-1999)
 Macedonia - Stevo Crvenkovski (1993-1996)
 Malta - Guido de Marco (1989-1996)
 Moldova -
Ion Botnaru (1993-1994)
Mihai Popov (1994-1997)
 Netherlands -
Pieter Kooijmans (1993-1994)
Hans van Mierlo (1994-1998)
 Norway -
Johan Jørgen Holst (1993-1994)
Bjørn Tore Godal (1994-1997)
 Poland - Andrzej Olechowski (1993-1995)
 Portugal - José Manuel Barroso (1992-1995)
 Romania - Teodor Meleşcanu (1992-1996)
 Russia - Andrey Kozyrev (1990-1996)
 Chechnya - Shamseddin Yusef (1992-1996)
 San Marino - Gabriele Gatti (1986-2002)
 Slovakia -
Jozef Moravčík (1993-1994)
Eduard Kukan (1994)
Juraj Schenk (1994-1996)
 Slovenia - Lojze Peterle (1993-1994)
 Spain - Javier Solana (1992-1995)
 Sweden -
Margaretha af Ugglas (1991-1994)
Lena Hjelm-Wallén (1994-1998)
 Switzerland - Flavio Cotti (1993-1999)
 Ukraine -
Anatoliy Zlenko (1990-1994)
Hennadiy Udovenko (1994-1998)
 United Kingdom - Douglas Hurd (1989-1995)
 Vatican City - Archbishop Jean-Louis Tauran (1990-2003)
 Yugoslavia - Vladislav Jovanović (1993-1995)
 Montenegro - Miodrag Lekić (1992-1995)

North America and the Caribbean
 Antigua and Barbuda - Lester Bird (1991-2004)
 The Bahamas -
Orville Turnquest (1992-1994)
Janet Bostwick (1994-2002)
 Barbados -
Branford Taitt (1993-1994)
Billie Miller (1994-2008)
 Belize - Dean Barrow (1993-1998)
 Canada - André Ouellet (1993-1996)
 Quebec -
 John Ciaccia (1989-1994)
 Bernard Landry (1994-1996)
 Costa Rica -
Bernd H. Niehaus Quesada (1990-1994)
Fernando Naranjo Villalobos (1994-1998)
 Cuba - Roberto Robaina (1993-1999)
 Dominica - Brian George Keith Alleyne (1990-1995)
 Dominican Republic -
Juan Aristides Taveras Guzmán (1991-1994)
Carlos Morales Troncoso (1994-1996)
 El Salvador -
José Manuel Pacas Castro (1989-1994)
Óscar Alfredo Santamaria (1994-1995)
 Grenada - Nicholas Brathwaite (1992-1995)
 Guatemala -
Arturo Fajardo Maldonado (1993-1994)
Gladys Maritza Ruiz de Vielman (1994-1995)
 Haiti - Claudette Werleigh (1993-1995)
 Honduras -
Mario Carías Zapata (1990-1994)
Ernesto Paz Aguilar (1994-1995)
 Jamaica - Paul Robertson (1993-1995)
 Mexico -
Manuel Camacho Solís (1993-1994)
Manuel Tello Macías (1994)
José Ángel Gurría (1994-1998)
 Nicaragua - Ernesto Leal (1992-1997)
 Panama -
José Raúl Mulino (1993-1994)
Gabriel Lewis Galindo (1994-1996)
 Puerto Rico – Baltasar Corrada del Río (1993–1995)
 Saint Kitts and Nevis - Kennedy Simmonds (1983-1995)
 Saint Lucia - George Mallet (1992-1996)
 Saint Vincent and the Grenadines -
Herbert Young (1992-1994)
Alpian Allen (1994-1998)
 Trinidad and Tobago - Ralph Maraj (1991-1995)
 United States - Warren Christopher (1993-1997)

South America
 Argentina - Guido di Tella (1991-1999)
 Bolivia - Antonio Araníbar Quiroga (1993-1997)
 Brazil - Celso Amorim (1993-1995)
 Chile -
Enrique Silva Cimma (1990-1994)
Carlos Figueroa Serrano (1994)
José Miguel Insulza (1994-1999)
 Colombia -
Noemí Sanín (1991-1994)
Rodrigo Pardo García-Peña (1994-1996)
 Ecuador -
Diego Paredes Peña (1992-1994)
Galo Leoro Franco (1994-1997)
 Guyana - Clement Rohee (1992-2001)
 Paraguay - Luis María Ramírez Boettner (1993-1996)
 Peru - Efrain Goldenberg (1993-1995)
 Suriname - Subhas Mungra (1991-1996)
 Uruguay - Sergio Abreu Bonilla (1993-1995)
 Venezuela -
Fernando Ochoa Antich (1992-1994)
Miguel Ángel Burelli Rivas (1994-1999)

Foreign ministers
1994